The Appley Bridge meteorite is a meteorite that hit ground at Halliwell Farm in Appley Bridge, Lancashire, England at around 8:45 PM on Tuesday, 13 October 1914.

After local residents saw a bolide, the meteorite was subsequently found in a farmer's field in the village the following day.

An article in Scientific News (No. 2588, 30 October 1914) stated "a small fragment which had been detached from the larger mass was put on view in a shop-window at Appley Bridge."

A collection of letters, memoranda, and news-cuttings pertaining to the meteorite is held by the Natural History Museum Archives in London. In 2011, a fragment weighing less than an ounce and mounted in a one-inch plastic gem case was sold by auctioneers Lyon & Turnbull in Edinburgh. It was expected to sell for £250.

See also
 Glossary of meteoritics
 Meteorite fall

References

Further reading
 Russell Parry (2014) The Appley  Bridge Meteorite

Borough of West Lancashire
Meteorite falls
1914 in England
Meteorites found in the United Kingdom